Simón José Antonio de la Santísima Trinidad Bolívar y Palacios (24 July 1783 – 17 December 1830) was a Venezuelan military and political leader who led what are currently the countries of Colombia, Venezuela, Ecuador, Peru, Panama and Bolivia to independence from the Spanish Empire. He is known colloquially as El Libertador, or the Liberator of America.

Simón Bolívar was born in Caracas in the Captaincy General of Venezuela into a wealthy criollo family. Before he turned ten, he lost both parents and lived in several households. Bolívar was educated abroad and lived in Spain, as was common for men of upper-class families in his day. While living in Madrid from 1800 to 1802, he was introduced to Enlightenment philosophy and met his future wife María Teresa Rodríguez del Toro y Alaysa. After returning to Venezuela, in 1803 del Toro contracted yellow fever and died. From 1803 to 1805, Bolívar embarked on a grand tour that ended in Rome, where he swore to end the Spanish rule in the Americas. In 1807, Bolívar returned to Venezuela and proposed gaining Venezuelan independence to other wealthy creoles. When the Spanish authority in the Americas weakened due to Napoleon's Peninsular War, Bolívar became a zealous combatant and politician in the Spanish American wars of independence.

Bolívar began his military career in 1810 as a militia officer in the Venezuelan War of Independence, fighting Royalist forces for the first and second Venezuelan republics and the United Provinces of New Granada. After Spanish forces subdued New Granada in 1815, Bolívar was forced into exile on Jamaica. After befriending Haitian revolutionary leader Alexandre Pétion and promising to abolish slavery in South America, Bolívar received military support from Haiti. Returning to Venezuela, he established a third republic in 1817 and then crossed the Andes to liberate New Granada in 1819. Bolívar and his allies defeated the Spanish in New Granada in 1819, Venezuela and Panama in 1821, Ecuador in 1822, Peru in 1824, and Bolivia in 1825. Venezuela, New Granada, Ecuador, and Panama were merged into the Republic of Colombia (Gran Colombia), with Bolívar as president there and in Peru and Bolivia.

In his final years, Bolívar became increasingly disillusioned with the South American republics, and distanced from them because of his centralist ideology. He was successively removed from his offices until he resigned the presidency of Colombia and died of tuberculosis in 1830. His legacy is diverse and far-reaching within Latin America and beyond. He is regarded as a national and cultural icon throughout Latin America; the nations of Bolivia and Venezuela (as the Boliviarian Republic of Venezuela) are named after him, and he has been memorialized all over the world in the form of public art or street names and in popular culture.

Early life and family
He was baptized as Simón José Antonio de la Santísma Trinidad Bolívar y Palacios on 30 July. Simón was born into the Bolívar family, one of the wealthiest and most prestigious criollo families in the Spanish Americas. The first Bolívar to emigrate to the Americas was Simón de Bolívar, a Basque nobleman and notary official who arrived in Santo Domingo in the mid-16th century. In 1588–89, he joined the staff of Diego Osorio Villegas, Governor of Santo Domingo, when he was named Governor of the Venezuela Province and moved to Caracas. There, Simón de Bolívar's descendants would also serve in the colonial bureaucracy and marry into rich Caracas families. By the time Simón Bolívar was born, the Bolívars owned property throughout Venezuela.

Simón Bolívar's childhood was described by British historian John Lynch as "at once privileged and deprived." Juan Vicente died of tuberculosis on 19 January 1786, and left María de la Concepción Palacios and her father, as legal guardians over the Bolívar children's inheritances. Those children –  (born 1777),  (born 1779),  (born 1781), and Simón – were raised separately from each other and their mother, and, following colonial custom, by African house slaves; Simón  was raised by a slave named  whom he viewed as both a motherly and fatherly figure. On 6 July 1792, María de la Concepción also died of tuberculosis.

Education and first journey to Europe: 1793–1802
As a child, Bolívar was notoriously unruly. He came to loathe Carlos, who had no interest in Bolívar other than his inheritance, and neglected his studies. In 1793, Carlos Palacios enrolled Bolívar at  run by Simón Rodríguez. In June 1795, Bolívar fled his uncle's custody for the house of Maria Antonia and her husband. The couple sought formal recognition of his change of residence, but the Real Audiencia decided the matter in favor of Palacios, who sent Simón to live with Rodríguez.

After two months there, Bolívar was moved at the direction of the Real Audiencia back to the Palacios family home. In 1797, Rodríguez's connection to a pro-independence conspiracy forced him to go into exile, and Bolívar was enrolled in an honorary militia force. When he was commissioned as an officer after a year, his uncles Carlos and  decided to send Bolívar to join the latter in Madrid. There, Esteban was friends with Queen Maria Luisa's favorite, Manuel Mallo.

On 19 January 1799, Bolívar boarded the Spanish warship San Ildefonso at the port of La Guaira, bound for Cádiz. The ship sailed first to Veracruz to load Mexican silver for transit to Spain. The ship arrived on 2 February, but was prevented from leaving for seven weeks by a British blockade of Havana. The San Ildefonso docked in Santoña, on the northern coast of Spain, in May 1799. A little over a week later, Bolívar arrived in Madrid and joined Esteban, who found Bolívar to be "very ignorant". Esteban asked Gerónimo Enrique de Uztáriz y Tovar, a Caracas native and government official, to educate Bolívar. Uztáriz accepted and Bolívar, who moved into his residence in February 1800, was thoroughly educated.

At the same time, Mallo fell out of the Queen's favor and Manuel Godoy, her previous favorite, returned to power. As members of Mallo's faction at court, Esteban was arrested on pretense, and Bolívar was banished from court following a public incident at the Puerta de Toledo over the wearing of diamonds without royal permission. Bolívar also at this time met María Teresa Rodríguez del Toro y Alaysa, the daughter of another wealthy Caracas creole. They were engaged in August 1800, but were separated when the del Toros left Madrid for a summer home in Bilbao. After Uztáriz left Madrid for a government assignment in Teruel in 1801, Bolívar himself left for Bilbao and remained there when the del Toros returned to the capital in August 1801. Early in 1802, Bolívar traveled to Paris while he awaited permission to return to Madrid, which was granted in April.

Return to Venezuela and second journey to Europe: 1802–1805
Bolívar and del Toro, aged 18 and 21 respectively, were married in Madrid on 26 May 1802. The couple boarded the San Ildefonso in A Coruña on 15 June and sailed for La Guaira, where they arrived on 12 July, and settled in Caracas. There, del Toro fell ill and died of yellow fever on 22 January 1803 and was buried in the Bolívar family crypt at Caracas Cathedral. Bolívar was devastated by del Toro's death, and later told Louis Peru de Lacroix, one of his generals and biographers, that he swore to never remarry. By July 1803, Bolívar decided to leave Venezuela for Europe. He entrusted his estates to an agent and his brother and in October boarded a ship bound for Cádiz.

Bolívar arrived in Spain in December 1803, then traveled to Madrid to console his father-in-law. In March 1804, Madrid ordered all non-residents in the city to leave to alleviate a bread shortage brought about by resumed hostilities with Britain. While in Paris, Bolívar began a dalliance with the Countess Dervieu du Villars, at whose salon he likely met the naturalists Alexander von Humboldt and Aimé Bonpland, who had traveled through much of Spanish America from 1799 to 1804. Bolívar allegedly discussed Spanish American independence with them.

On 2 December 1804, Napoleon crowned himself Emperor in Notre Dame de Paris. Though he remained awed by Napoleon, Bolívar was disgusted and, in April 1805, left Paris with Rodríguez and del Toro on a Grand Tour to Italy. Beginning in Lyon, they traveled through the Savoy Alps and then to Milan. The trio arrived on 26 May 1805 and witnessed Napoleon's coronation as King of Italy. From Milan, they traveled down the Po Valley to Venice, then to Florence, and then finally Rome, where Bolívar met among others Pope Pius VII, the French writer Germaine de Staël, and Humboldt again. Rome's sites and history excited Bolívar. On 18 August 1805, he, del Toro, and Rodríguez traveled to the Mons Sacer, where the plebs had seceded from Rome, Bolívar swore to end Spanish rule in the Americas.

Political and military career

By April 1806, Bolívar had returned to Paris and desired passage to Venezuela, where Venezuelan revolutionary Francisco de Miranda had just attempted an invasion with American volunteers. British control of the seas resulting from the 1805 Battle of Trafalgar, however, obliged Bolívar to board an American ship in Hamburg in October 1806. Bolívar arrived in Charleston, South Carolina, in January 1807, and from there traveled to Washington, D.C., Philadelphia, New York City, and Boston. After six months in the United States, Bolívar returned to Philadelphia and sailed for Venezuela, where he arrived in June 1807. He began to meet with other creole elites to discuss independence from Spain. Finding himself to be far more radical than the rest of Caracas high society, however, Bolívar occupied himself with a property dispute with a neighbor, .

In 1807–08, Napoleon invaded the Iberian peninsula and replaced the rulers of Spain with his brother. This news arrived in Venezuela in July 1808. Napoleonic rule was rejected and Venezuelan creoles, though still loyal to Ferdinand VII of Spain, sought to form their own local government in place of the existing Spanish government. Bolívar, who did not sign the petition, was not arrested but was warned to cease hosting or attending seditious meetings. In May 1809, Casas was replaced by Vicente Emparán and his staff, which included Fernando Rodríguez del Toro. Emparán's government, while friendlier to the creoles and connected to some of the opposition leaders, was also resisted by the creoles.

By February 1810, French victories in Spain prompted the dissolution of the anti-French Spanish government in favor of a five-man regency council for Ferdinand VII. This news, and two delegates that included Carlos de Montúfar, arrived in Venezuela on 17 April 1810. Two days later, the creoles succeeded in deposing and then expelling Emparán, and created the Supreme Junta of Caracas, independent from the Spanish regency but not Ferdinand VII. Absent from Caracas for the coup, the Bolívar brothers returned to the city and offered their services to the Supreme Junta as diplomats. In May 1810, Juan Vicente was sent to the United States to buy weapons, while Simón secured a place in a diplomatic mission to Great Britain with the lawyer  and Andrés Bello by paying for the mission. The trio boarded a British warship in June 1810 and arrived at Portsmouth on 10 July 1810.

The three delegates first met Miranda at his London residence, despite instructions from the Supreme Junta to avoid him, and thereafter received the benefit of his connections and consultation. On 16 July 1810, the Venezuelan delegation met the British foreign secretary, Richard Wellesley, at his residence. Led by Bolívar, the Venezuelans argued in favor of Venezuelan independence. Wellesley stated that it was intolerable for Anglo-Spanish relations, and moreover was using his talks with the Venezuelans to secure access to Spanish American markets for British merchants from the Spanish regency. Subsequent meetings produced no recognition or concrete support from Britain. Finding that he had many shared beliefs with Miranda, however, Bolívar convinced him to come back to Venezuela. On 22 September 1810, Bolívar left for Venezuela while López and Bello remained in London as diplomats, and arrived in La Guaira on 5 December. Miranda, whose return to Venezuela the British government did not desire but could not prevent, arrived later in December.

Venezuela: 1811–1812
While Bolívar was in England, the Supreme Junta passed liberal economic reforms and began to hold elections for representatives to a congress to be held in Caracas. It had also alienated Caracas from the Venezuelan provinces of Coro, Maracaibo, and Guayana, which professed loyalty to the regency council, and began hostilities with them. Helping to create the Patriotic Society, Bolívar and Miranda campaigned for and secured the latter's election to the congress. The congress first met on 2 March 1811 and declared its allegiance to Ferdinand VII. After it was discovered that one of the men leading the congress was a Spanish agent who had escaped with military documents, however, discourse – which Bolívar was prominent in – changed decidedly in favor of independence over 3 and 4 July. Finally, on 5 July, the congress declared Venezuela's independence.

The declaration of independence created a republic with a weak base of support and enemies in conservative whites, disenfranchised people of color, and already hostile Venezuelan provinces, which received troops and supplies from the Captaincy-Generals of Puerto Rico and Cuba. On 13 July 1811, the republic raised militias to fight the pro-Spanish Royalists. As a condition of assuming command of the Republican forces, Miranda had Bolívar removed from his command of a militia unit. Bolívar nonetheless fought in the Valencia campaign as part of del Toro's militia and was selected by Miranda to bring news of its recapture to Caracas, where he argued for more punitive and forceful campaigning against the Royalists.

Beginning in November 1811, Royalist forces began pushing back the Republicans on from the north and east. Then, on 26 March 1812, a powerful earthquake devastated Republican Venezuela; Caracas itself was almost totally destroyed. Bolívar, who was still in the area of Caracas, rushed into the city to participate in the rescue of survivors and exhumation of the dead. The earthquake also destroyed public support for the republic, as it was believed to have been divine retribution for declaring independence from Spain. By April, a Royalist army under the Spanish naval officer Juan Domingo de Monteverde overran western Venezuela. Miranda, retreating east with a disintegrating army, ordered Bolívar to assume command of the coastal city of Puerto Cabello and its fortress, which contained Royalist prisoners and most of the republic's remaining arms and ammunition.

Bolívar arrived at Puerto Cabello on 4 May 1812. On 30 June, a Royalist officer of the fort's garrison released its prisoners, armed them, and turned its cannons on Puerto Cabello. Weakened by shelling, defections, and lack of supplies, Bolívar and his remaining troops fled for La Guaira on 6 July. Believing the republic to be doomed, Miranda decided to capitulate, shocking Bolívar and other Republican officers. After formally surrendering his command to Monteverde on 25 July, Miranda made his way to La Guaira, where a group of conspirators including Bolívar arrested Miranda on 30 July on charges of treason. La Guaira declared for the Royalists the next day and closed its port on Monteverde's orders. Miranda was taken into Spanish custody and moved to a prison in Cádiz, where he died on 16 July 1816.

New Granada and Venezuela: 1812–1815
Bolívar and Casa León convinced Francisco Iturbe, a friend of the Bolívar family and of Monteverde, to intercede on Bolívar's behalf and secure escape from Venezuela for him. Iturbe persuaded Monteverde to issue Bolívar a passport for his role in Miranda's arrest, and on 27 August he sailed for Curaçao. He and his uncles Francisco and José Félix Ribas arrived on 1 September. Late in October, the exiles arranged for passage to the city of Cartagena in New Granada to offer their services to the United Provinces of New Granada. Labatut, a former partisan of Miranda, begrudgingly obliged and on 1 December 1812 placed Bolívar in command of the 70-man garrison of a town on the lower Magdalena River.

While en route to his posting, Bolívar issued the Cartagena Manifesto, outlining what he believed to be the causes of the Venezuelan republic's defeat and his political program. In particular, Bolívar called for the disparate New Granadan republics to help him invade Venezuela to prevent a Royalist invasion of New Granada. Bolívar arrived on the Magdalena River on 21 December and, in spite of orders from Labatut to not act without his direction, launched an offensive that secured control of the Magdalena River by 8 January 1813. In February, he joined forces with Republican colonel , who requested Bolívar's assistance with stopping a Royalist advance into New Granada from Venezuela, and captured the city of Cúcuta.

In early March 1813, Bolívar set up his headquarters in Cúcuta and sent José Félix Ribas to request permission to invade Venezuela. Though rewarded with honorary citizenship in New Granada and a promotion to the rank of brigadier general, that permission did not come until 7 May because of del Castillo's opposition to the invasion. When a limited invasion was permitted, Castillo resigned his command and was succeeded by Francisco de Paula Santander. On 14 May, Bolívar launched the Admirable Campaign, in which he issued the Decree of War to the Death, ordering the death of all Spaniards in South America not actively aiding his forces. Within six months, Bolívar pushed all the way to Caracas, which he entered on 6 August, and then drove Monteverde out of Venezuela in October. Bolívar returned to Caracas on 14 October and was named "The Liberator" (El Libertador) by its town council, a title first given to him by the citizens of the Venezuelan town of Mérida on 23 May.

On 2 January 1814, Bolívar was made the dictator of a Second Republic of Venezuela, which retained the weaknesses of the first republic. Though all of Venezuela but Maracaibo, Coro, and Guayana was controlled by Republicans, Bolívar only governed western Venezuela. Venezuela was economically devastated and could not support the republic's armies, and people of color remained disenfranchised and thus unsupportive of the republic. The republic was assailed from all sides by slave revolts and Royalist forces, especially the Legion of Hell, an army of llaneros – the colored cowboys of the Llanos, to the south – led by the Spanish warlord José Tomás Boves. Beginning in February 1814, Boves surged out of the Llanos and overwhelmed the republic, occupying Caracas on 16 July and then destroying Mariño's powerbase on 5 December at the Battle of Urica, where he died.

As Boves approached Caracas, Bolívar ordered the city stripped of its gold and silver, which was moved through La Guaira to Barcelona, Venezuela, and from there to Cumaná. Bolívar then led 20,000 of its citizens east. He arrived in Barcelona on 2 August, but following  at Aragua de Barcelona on 17 August 1814, he moved to Cumaná. On 26 August, he sailed with Mariño to Margarita Island with the treasure. The officer in control of the island, Manuel Piar, declared Bolívar and Mariño to be traitors and forced them to return to the mainland. There, Ribas also accused Bolívar and Mariño of treachery, confiscated the treasure, and then exiled the two on 8 September. Bolívar arrived in Cartagena on 19 September and then met with the New Granadan congress in Tunja, which tasked him with subduing the rival Free and Independent State of Cundinamarca. On 12 December, Bolívar captured Cundinamarca's capital, Bogotá, and was given command of New Granada's armies in January 1815. Bolívar next grappled with del Castillo, who had taken control of Cartagena. Bolívar began  that allowed the Royalists to regain control of the Magdalena. On 8 May, Bolívar made a truce with del Castillo, resigned his command, and sailed for exile on Jamaica. In July, 8,000 Spanish soldiers commanded by Spanish general Pablo Morillo landed at Santa Marta and then , which capitulated on 6 December; del Castillo was executed.

Jamaica, Haiti, Venezuela, and New Granada: 1815–1819

Bolívar arrived in Kingston, Jamaica, on 14 May 1815 and, like his earlier exile on Curaçao, ruminated on the fall of the Venezuelan and New Granadan republics. He wrote extensively, requesting assistance from Britain and corresponding with merchants based in the Caribbean. This culminated in September 1815 with the Jamaica Letter, in which Bolívar again laid out his ideology and vision of the future of the Americas. On 9 December, the Venezuelan pirate Renato Beluche brought Bolívar news from New Granada and asked him to join the Republican community in exile in Haiti. Bolívar tentatively accepted and that night escaped assassination when his manservant mistakenly killed his paymaster as part of a Spanish plot. He left Jamaica eight days later, arrived in Les Cayes on 24 December, and on 2 January 1816 was introduced to Alexandre Pétion, President of the Republic of Haiti by a mutual friend. Bolívar and Pétion impressed and befriended each other and, after Bolívar pledged to free every slave in the areas he occupied, Pétion gave him money and military supplies.

Returning to Les Cayes, Bolívar held a conference with the Republican leaders in Haiti and was made supreme leader with Mariño as his chief of staff. The Republicans departed Les Cayes for Venezuela on 31 March 1816 and followed the Antilles eastward. After a delay to allow a lover of Bolívar's to join the fleet, it arrived on 2 May at Margarita Island, controlled by Republican commander Juan Bautista Arismendi. Bolívar next moved to the mainland, where he declared the emancipation of all slaves and annulled of the Decree of War to the Death. He took Carúpano on 31 May and sent Mariño and Piar into Guayana to build their own army, and then Ocumare de la Costa on 6 July. There, by 14 July, his forces were defeated and scattered by a Royalist force that then captured Ocumare and the Haitian supplies. Bolívar fled by sea to Güiria where, on 22 August, he was deposed by Mariño and José Francisco Bermúdez, who tried to kill Bolívar with a sword.

Bolívar returned to Haiti by early September, where Pétion again agreed to assist him. In his absence, the Republican leaders scattered across Venezuela, concentrating in the Llanos, and became disunited warlords. Unwilling to recognize Mariño's leadership,  Arismendi wrote to Bolívar and dispatched New Granadan Republican Francisco Antonio Zea to convince him to return. Bolívar and Zea set sail for Venezuela on 21 December with Luis Brión, a Dutch merchant, and arrived ten days later at Barcelona. There, Bolívar announced his return and called for a congress for a new, third republic. He wrote to the Republican leaders, especially José Antonio Páez, who controlled most of the western Llanos, to unite under his leadership. On 8 January 1817, Bolívar marched towards Caracas but was turned back and then pursued to Barcelona by a larger Royalist force. At Bolívar's request, Mariño arrived on 8 February with Bermúdez, who then reconciled with Bolívar, and forced a Royalist withdrawal.

Even with their combined forces, however, Bolívar, Mariño, and Bermúdez could not hold Barcelona. Instead, on 25 March 1817, Bolívar began moving south to join Piar in Guayana, Piar's power base, and establish his own economic and political base there. Bolívar met Piar on 4 April, promoted him to the rank of general of the army, and then joined a force of Piar's troops besieging the city of Angostura (now Ciudad Bolívar) on 2 May. Meanwhile, Mariño went east to reestablish his power base and on 8 May convened a congress of ten men, including Brión and Zea, that named Mariño as supreme commander of the Republican forces. This backfired and provoked the defection of 30 officers, including Rafael Urdaneta and Antonio José de Sucre, to Bolívar. On 30 June, Bolívar granted Piar leave of absence at his request, and then issued an arrest warrant on 23 July after Piar began fomenting rebellion, alleging that Bolívar had dismissed him because of his African heritage. Piar was captured on 27 September as he fled to join Mariño and was brought to Angostura, where he was executed by firing squad on 16 October. Bolívar then sent Sucre to reconcile with Mariño, who pledged loyalty to Bolívar on 26 January 1818.

On 17 July 1817,  to Bolívar's forces, which then gained control of the Orinoco River in early August. Angostura became the provisional Republican capital and in September, Bolívar began creating formal political and military structures for the republic. Bolívar then gained recognition as supreme leader from Páez, whom he met at San Juan de Payara on 30 January 1818. In February 1818, the Republicans moved north and took Calabozo, where , who had returned to Venezuela a year earlier after conquering Republican New Granada. Illness and additional Republican defeats obliged Bolívar to return to Angostura in May. For the rest of the year, he focused on administrating the republic, rebuilding its armed forces, and organizing elections for a national congress that would meet in 1819.

Gran Colombia: 1819–1830

The congress met in Angostura on 15 February 1819. There, Bolívar gave a speech in which he advocated for a centralized government modeled on the British government and racial equality, and relinquished civil authority to the congress. On 16 February, the congress elected Bolívar as president and Zea as vice president. In May, as the annual wet season was beginning in the Llanos, Bolívar met with his officers and revealed his intention to invade New Granada, which he had prepared for by sending Santander to build up Republican forces in Casanare Province in August 1818. On 27 May, Bolívar marched with more than 2,000 soldiers toward the Andes and left Páez, Mariño, Urdaneta, and Bermúdez to tie down Morillo's forces in Venezuela.

Bolívar entered Casanare Province with his army on 4 June 1819, then met up with Santander at Tame, Arauca, on 11 June. The combined Republican force reached the Eastern Range of the Andes on 22 June and began a grueling crossing. After a brief convalescence, the Republicans made rapid progress against the forces of Spanish colonel  until, on 7 August, the Royalists were routed at the Battle of Boyacá. On 10 August, Bolívar entered Bogotá, which the Spanish officials had hastily abandoned, and captured the viceregal treasury and armories. After sending forces to secure Republican control of central New Granada, Bolívar paraded through Bogotá on 18 September with Santander.

Desiring to merge New Granada and Venezuela into a "greater republic of Colombia", Bolívar first established a provisional government in Bogotá with Santander, and then left to resume campaigning against the Royalists in Venezuela on 20 September 1819. En route, he learned that Santander had executed Barreiro and other Royalist prisoners on 11 October and that Zea had been replaced as vice president in September 1819 by Arismendi, who was conspiring with Mariño against Urdaneta and Bermúdez. Bolívar arrived in Angostura on 11 December and, by being conciliatory, restored order. He then proposed the merging of New Granada and Venezuela to the congress on 14 December, which was approved. On 17 December, the congress issued a decree creating the Republic of Colombia, including the regions of Venezuela, New Granada, and the still Spanish-controlled Real Audiencia of Quito, and elected Bolívar and Zea president and vice president respectively.

After Christmas Day, 1819, Bolívar left Angostura to direct campaigns against Royalist forces along the Caribbean coasts of Venezuela and New Granada. He met with Santander in Bogotá in March 1820, then rode to Cúcuta and inspected Republican forces in northern Colombia over April and May 1820. News of the mutiny and its consequences arrived in Colombia in March and was followed by orders from Spain to Morillo to publicize the constitution and negotiate a peace that would return Colombia to the Spanish Empire. Bolívar and Morillo, seeking to gain leverage over each other, delayed talks until 21 November, when Colombian and Royalist delegates met in Trujillo, Venezuela. The delegates completed  on 25 November, establishing a six-month truce, a prisoner exchange, and basic rights for combatants. After this meeting, Morillo turned his command over to Spanish general Miguel de la Torre and departed for Spain on 17 December.

In February 1821, as Bolívar was traveling from Bogotá to Cúcuta in anticipation of the opening of a new congress there, he learned that Royalist-controlled Maracaibo had defected to Colombia and been occupied by Urdaneta. La Torre protested to Bolívar, who refused to return Maracaibo, leading to a renewal of hostilities on 28 April. Over May and June, Colombia's armies made rapid progress until, on 24 June, Bolívar and Páez decisively defeated La Torre at the Battle of Carabobo. All Royalist forces remaining in Venezuela were eliminated by August 1823. Bolívar entered Caracas in triumph on 29 June, and issued a decree on 16 July dividing Venezuela into three military zones governed by Páez, Bermúdez, and Mariño. Bolívar then met with the Congress of Cúcuta, which had ratified the formation of Gran Colombia and elected him as president and Santander as vice president in September. Bolívar accepted and was sworn in on 3 October, although he protested the establishment of a precedent of military leaders as head of the Colombian state.

Ecuador, Peru, and Bolivia: 1821–1826

After the Battle of Carabobo, Bolívar turned his attention south, to Pasto, Colombia; Quito and the Free Province of Guayaquil, Ecuador; and the Viceroyalty of Peru. Pasto and Quito were Royalist strongholds, while Guayaquil had declared its independence on 9 October 1820 and had been garrisoned by Sucre on Bolívar's orders in January 1821. Panama declared its independence on 28 November 1821 and joined Colombia. Peru had been invaded by a Republican army led by Argentine general José de San Martín, who had liberated Chile and Peru, and Bolívar feared San Martín would absorb Ecuador into Peru. In October 1821, after congress empowered him to secure Ecuador for Colombia, Bolívar assembled an army in Bogotá that departed on 13 December 1821.

To the south, Sucre, who had been trapped in Guayaquil by Royalist advances from Quito, now advanced, decisively defeated the Royalists at the Battle of Pichincha on 24 May 1822, and occupied Quito. On 6 June, Pasto surrendered, and ten days later Bolívar paraded through Quito with Sucre. He also met the Ecuadorian Republican Manuela Sáenz, the wife of a British merchant, with whom he began a lasting affair. From Quito, Bolívar traveled to Guayaquil in anticipation of a meeting with San Martín to discuss the city's status and rallied support for its annexation by Colombia. By the time San Martín arrived in Guayaquil on 26 July, Bolívar had already secured Guayaquil for Colombia, and the two-day Guayaquil Conference produced no agreement between Bolívar and San Martín. Ill, politically isolated, and disillusioned, San Martín subsequently resigned from his offices and went into exile.

Over the rest of 1822, Bolívar traveled around Ecuador to complete its annexation while dispatching officers to suppress repeated rebellions in Pasto and resisting calls to return to Bogotá or Venezuela. Meanwhile, Royalist forces under general José de Canterac . After initially refusing Colombian assistance, the Peruvian congress asked Bolívar several times in 1823 to assume command of their forces. Bolívar responded by sending an army under Sucre to assist, then delayed his own departure to Peru until he obtained permission from the Colombian congress on 3 August. When Bolívar arrived in Lima, Peru's capital, on 1 September, Peru was split between two rival presidents, José de la Riva Agüero and José Bernardo de Tagle, and the Royalists, based out of the region of Upper Peru. In November 1823, Riva Agüero, who plotted with the Royalists against Bolívar, was betrayed by his officers to Bolívar and then exiled from Peru. Then, over the first two months of 1824, Bolívar was bedridden with fever and Tagle, with the garrison and city of Callao, defected to the Royalists and briefly took Lima. In response, the Peruvian congress named Bolívar dictator of Peru on 10 February 1824. Bolívar moved to northern Peru in March and began assembling an army, for which he increasingly demanded additional men and money from Santander, straining their relationship. In May 1824, after learning of  against the Viceroy, José de la Serna, by conservative Royalist Pedro Antonio Olañeta, Bolívar advanced and then defeated Canterac at the Battle of Junín on 6 August.

Choosing to ignore Olañeta, La Serna ordered his forces to concentrate at Cuzco to face Bolívar. Heavy rainfall in September halted Bolívar's advance, and on 6 October he gave command of the army to Sucre and moved to Huancayo to manage political affairs. On 24 October, Bolívar received a letter from Santander informing him that the Colombian congress had stripped him of his military and civil authority in favor of Sucre and Santander, respectively. Although indignant and resentful of Santander, Bolívar wrote to him on 10 November to communicate his acquiescence and reoccupied Lima on 5 December 1824. On 9 December, Sucre decisively defeated La Serna's Royalists at the Battle of Ayacucho and accepted  of all Royalist forces in Peru. The garrison of Callao and Olañeta ignored the surrender. Shortly after arriving in Lima, Bolívar began a siege of Callao that lasted until January 1826, and sent Sucre into Upper Peru to eliminate Olañeta, which he accomplished in April 1825.

In early 1825, Bolívar resigned from his offices in Colombia and Peru, but neither nation's congress accepted his resignation; on 10 February 1825, the Peruvian congress extended his dictatorship for another year. Accepting the extension, Bolívar settled into governing Peru and passing reforms that were largely not carried out, such as a school system based on the principles of English educator Joseph Lancaster that was managed by Simón Rodríguez. In April 1825, Bolívar began a tour of southern Peru that took him to the cities of Arequipa and Cuzco by August. As Bolívar approached Upper Peru, a congress gathered in the city of Chuquisaca (now Sucre); on 6 August, it declared the region to be the nation of Bolivia, named Bolívar President, and asked him to write a constitution for Bolivia. Bolívar arrived in Potosí on 5 October and met with two Argentine agents, Carlos María de Alvear and José Miguel Díaz Vélez, who tried without success to convince him to intervene in the Cisplatine War against the Empire of Brazil.

From Potosí, Bolívar traveled to Chuquisaca and appointed Sucre to govern Bolivia on 29 December 1825; he departed for Peru on 1 January 1826. Bolívar arrived in Lima on 10 February and dispatched his draft of the Bolivian constitution to Sucre on 12 May.  was ratified with modification by the Bolivian congress in July 1826. Peru, whose elites chafed at Bolívar's rule and the presence of his soldiers, was also induced to accept a modified version of Bolívar's constitution  on 16 August. In Venezuela, Páez revolted against Santander, and in Panama, a congress of American nations organized by Bolívar convened without his attendance and produced no change in the hemispheric status quo. On 3 September, responding to pleas for his return to Colombia, Bolívar departed Peru and left it under a governing council led by Bolivian general Andrés de Santa Cruz.

Final years: 1826–1830
Bolívar arrived in Guayaquil on 13 September 1826 and heard complaints against Santander's governance from the people of Guayaquil and Quito, who declared him their dictator. From Ecuador, he continued north and heard more complaints, promoted civil and military officers, and commuted prison sentences. As he approached Bogotá, Bolívar was met by Santander, who hoped to persuade Bolívar to his cause in the conflict with Páez. Although Santander was annoyed at Bolívar for his desire to return to power and ratify a version of the Bolivian constitution in Colombia, they reconciled and agreed that Bolívar would resume the presidency of Colombia; congress had reelected them to a second four-year term beginning on 2 January 1827. Bolívar arrived in Bogotá on 14 November 1826 and found the city hostile to him for violations of Colombian law.

On 25 November, Bolívar left Bogotá with an army supplied by Santander and arrived at Puerto Cabello on 31 December, where he issued a general amnesty to Páez and his allies if they submitted to his authority. Páez accepted and in January 1827, Bolívar confirmed Páez's military authority in Venezuela and entered Caracas with him to much jubilation; for two months, Bolívar attended balls celebrating his return and the amnesty. That amnesty, and clashes over Santander's handling of Colombia's finances, caused a break between Bolívar and Santander that became an open enmity in 1827. In February 1827, Bolívar submitted his resignation from the Presidency of Colombia, which its congress rejected. Meanwhile, the Colombian soldiers garrisoned in Lima mutinied, arrested their Venezuelan officers, and occupied Guayaquil until September 1827. Bolívar was deposed as President in Peru and his constitution was repealed.

Bolívar departed Venezuela to return to Bogotá in July 1827. He arrived on 10 September with an army he had gathered at Cartagena and was again sworn in as President of Colombia, then secured the calling of a new congress to meet at the city of Ocaña in early 1828 to modify the Colombian constitution. The elections for this congress were held in November 1827 and, as Bolívar declined to campaign, were very favorable to his political opponents. In January 1828, Bolívar was joined in Bogotá by Sáenz, but on 16 March 1828 he left the capital after being informed of a Spanish-backed rebellion in Venezuela. As that revolt was crushed before he arrived, Bolívar turned his attention to the occupation of Cartagena by José Prudencio Padilla, a New Granadan admiral and Santander loyalist. Padilla's rebellion was also crushed before Bolívar arrived, however, and he was subsequently arrested and imprisoned in Bogotá. As the Convention of Ocaña opened on 9 April, Bolívar based himself at Bucaramanga to monitor its proceedings through his aides.

The convention lasted until 11 June 1828, when Bolívar's allies staged a walkout that left Colombia without a constitution. Two days later, Pedro Alcántara Herrán, a Bolívar loyalist and the governor of New Granada, called a meeting of the city's bourgeoisie that denounced the Convention of Ocaña and called on Bolívar to assume absolute power in Colombia. Bolívar returned to Bogotá on 24 June and on 27 August assumed supreme power as the "president-liberator" of Colombia, abolished the office of the vice president, and assigned Santander to a diplomatic posting in Washington, D.C. On 25 September 1828, a group of young liberals that included Santander's secretary made an attempt to assassinate Bolívar and overthrow his government. The attempt was thwarted by Sáenz, who bought time for Bolívar to escape as the assassins entered the Palacio de San Carlos, and the Colombian Army. Bolívar spent the night hiding under a bridge until soldiers loyal to his regime rescued him.

In the aftermath of the attempted coup, Santander and the conspirators were arrested. Bolívar, depressed and ill, considered resigning from politics and pardoning the conspirators, but was dissuaded from this by his officers. Padilla, though uninvolved with the attempted coup, was executed; Santander, whom Bolívar thought responsible for the plot, was pardoned but exiled from Colombia. In December 1828, Bolívar left Bogotá to respond to Peru's intervention in Bolivia and invasion of Ecuador and a revolt in Popayán and Pasto led by José María Obando. He left behind a council of ministers led by Urdaneta to govern Colombia and announced that a congress would convene in January 1830 to devise a new constitution. Over 1829, Obando was defeated by Colombian general José María Córdova at Bolívar's direction in January and then pardoned, while Sucre and Venezuelan general Juan José Flores defeated the Peruvians at the Battle of Tarqui in February, leading to an armistice in July and then the Treaty of Guayaquil in September.

While Bolívar was away, Urdaneta and the council of ministers planned with French envoys to have a Bourbon succeed Bolívar on his death as King of Colombia. This plan was widely unpopular, and inspired Córdova to launch a revolt that was crushed in October 1829 by Daniel Florence O'Leary, Bolívar's aide-de-camp. In November, Bolívar ordered the council to cease its planning, which its members responded to by resigning, and Venezuelans, encouraged by a circular letter Bolívar had published in October, voted to secede from Colombia and exile him. On 15 January 1830, Bolívar arrived in Bogotá and on 20 January the  convened in the city. Bolívar submitted his resignation from the presidency, which the congress rejected until 27 April, following Bolívar's appointment of New Granadan politician Domingo Caycedo as interim President.

Death and burial

Determined to go into exile, Bolívar, who had given away or lost his fortune over his career, sold most of his remaining possessions and departed Bogotá on 8 May 1830. He traveled down the Magdalena to Cartagena, where he arrived by the end of June to wait for a ship to take him to England. On 1 July, Bolívar was informed that Sucre had been assassinated near Pasto while en route to Quito, and wrote to Flores to him to avenge Sucre. In September, Urdaneta installed a conservative government in Bogotá and asked Bolívar to return and was refused. With his health deteriorating and no ship forthcoming, Bolívar was moved by his staff to Barranquilla in October and then, at the invitation of a Spanish landowner in the area, to the Quinta de San Pedro Alejandrino near Santa Marta. There, on 17 December 1830, at the age of 47, Bolívar died of tuberculosis.

In 1842, Páez secured the repatriation of Bolívar's remains, which were paraded through Caracas and then laid to rest in its cathedral in December together with his wife and parents; Bolívar's heart remained in Santa Marta. His remains were moved again in October 1876 into the National Pantheon of Venezuela in Caracas, created that year by President Antonio Guzmán Blanco. The Quinta near Santa Marta has been preserved as a museum to Bolívar and the house in which he was born was opened as a museum and archive of his papers on 5 July 1921.

In January 2008, President Hugo Chávez set up a commission to investigate his claim that Bolívar had been poisoned by "New Granada traitors". The commission exhumed Bolívar's remains on 16 July 2010. Its findings, that Bolívar had died of histoplasmosis, a fungal infection that manifests symptoms similar to tuberculosis, which was aggravated by arsenic poisoning, were announced by Vice President Elías Jaua on 25 July 2012. Infectious disease specialist Paul Auwaerter suggested in a 2011 paper the fungal infection paracoccidioidomycosis, aggravated by arsenic poisoning.

Personal beliefs
Bolívar's personal beliefs were liberal and republican, and formed by Classical and Enlightenment philosophy; among his favorite authors were Hobbes, Spinoza, the Baron d'Holbach, Hume, Montesquieu, and Rousseau. The tutelage of Simón Rodríguez, a student of Rousseau, has also been traditionally seen as foundational for Bolívar's beliefs. Also important to Bolívar's intellectual development were his stays in Paris from 1804 to 1806 and in London in 1810. Bolívar was an anglophile, and sought British aid in securing Latin American independence. The extent of Bolívar's religiosity is debated; while Bolívar resented the social capital of the Catholic Church and its Royalist leanings during the wars of independence, he sought to co-opt its social capital for the benefit of the republics he established rather than dismember the Church.

Throughout his political career, Bolívar concerned himself with the construction of liberal democracy in Latin America and the region's place in the Atlantic world. What he desired to create in Spanish America by the 1820s was a federation of Latin American republics governed by a strong executive and a constitution modeled on the British constitution. Inspired by Montesquieu, Bolívar believed that a government should conform to the needs and character of its region and inhabitants; in the Cartagena Manifesto, Bolívar stated that federalism as practiced in the United States as the "perfect" government but was unworkable in Spanish America because of the effects of Spanish imperialism on Spanish Americans. Bolívar sought to prepare Colombia for a more liberal democracy via free, public education. Over the 1820s, Bolívar became increasingly disillusioned and authoritarian until, in 1830, he infamously declared, "all who have served the Revolution have plowed the sea."

Legacy

Bolívar has had an immense and controversial legacy, becoming the essential personality of Latin America; he is known in the English-speaking world as Latin America's George Washington. He has been memorialized across the world in literature, public monuments, and historiography, and paid tribute to in the names of towns, cities, provinces, and other people, such as the American soldier Simon Bolivar Buckner, born in 1823. Bolívar's birthday, July 24, is a national holiday in Venezuela.

Initial historical evaluations of Bolívar were at first negative, consisting of criticism of his conduct of the war, execution of Piar, betrayal of Miranda, and authoritarianism. These and other criticisms endure in studies of Bolívar. Beginning in 1842, however, popular opinion about Bolívar in Venezuela became overwhelmingly positive and eventually became what has been described by scholars as the "cult of Bolívar", led by succeeding heads of the Venezuelan state. In 1998, Venezuela was renamed as the Bolivarian Republic of Venezuela by Chávez, who made extensive use of Bolívar's image for government projects and initiatives. In Colombia, allegiance or opposition to Bolívar formed the bedrock of the Conservative and Liberal parties respectively. Bolívar continued to have such a cultural influence in Colombia that in 1974 the 19th of April Movement, an insurgent leftist group that later joined an alliance thereof called the Simón Bolívar Guerrilla Coordinating Board,  alleged to belong to Bolívar from his Bogotá residence.

See also
 Toussaint Louverture

References

Notes

Bibliography

Biographies of Simón Bolívar

Works by Simón Bolívar

General reference

Further reading
 Bushnell, David. The Liberator, Simón Bolívar: Man and Image. New York: Alfred A. Knopf, 1970.
 Bushnell, David and Macaulay, Neill. The Emergence of Latin America in the Nineteenth Century (Second edition). Oxford and New York: Oxford University Press, 1994. 
 Gómez Martínez, José Luis. "La encrucijada del cambio: Simón Bolívar entre dos paradigmas (una reflexión ante la encrucijada postindustrial)". Cuadernos Americanos 104 (2004): 11–32.
 Lacroix, Luis Perú de. Diario de Bucaramanga. Caracas: Ministerio del Poder Popular para la Comunicación y la Información, 2009.
 Lynch, John. Simón Bolívar and the Age of Revolution. London: University of London Institute of Latin American Studies, 1983. 
 Marx, Karl. "Bolívar y Ponte" in the New American Cyclopaedia, Vol. III. New York: D. Appleton & Co., 1858.
 Racine, Karen. "Simón Bolívar and friends: Recent biographies of independence figures in Colombia and Venezuela" History Compass 18#3 (Feb 2020) https://doi.org/10.1111/hic3.12608

External links
 Archivo del Libertador (In Spanish) –12,000+ transcribed documents of the Libertador, from 1799 to 1830.

1783 births
1830 deaths
Presidents of Gran Colombia
Presidents of Peru
19th-century Bolivian people
19th-century Colombian people
19th-century deaths from tuberculosis
19th-century male writers
19th-century Peruvian people
19th-century Venezuelan people
Radicals
Bolívar family
Burials at the National Pantheon of Venezuela
Guerrilla warfare theorists
Venezuelan independence activists
Tuberculosis deaths in Colombia
People from Caracas
People of the Peruvian War of Independence
People of the Spanish American wars of independence
People of the Venezuelan War of Independence
Presidents of Bolivia
Presidents of Venezuela
Venezuelan Freemasons
Venezuelan generals
Venezuelan people of Basque descent
Venezuelan people of Canarian descent
Venezuelan people of Spanish descent
Venezuelan revolutionaries
Venezuelan Roman Catholics
Venezuelan soldiers